Deportes Quindío is a  professional Colombian football club based in Armenia that currently plays in the Categoría Primera B. The club was founded on 8 January 1951, and its best achievement was winning the 1956 league tournament. They play their home games at the Centenario stadium. The club was called Atlético Quindío from 1953 to 1963.

History
Deportes Quindío was founded on 8 January 1951, after a group of high-ranking personalities from the city of Armenia, at that time still part of the Caldas Department, hired the players of Argentine team Rosario Wanders team, which by the end of 1950 was on a tour of Colombia. After several talks with manager Próspero Fabrini and Moisés Emilio Reuben, who were in charge of the Argentine squad, an agreement was reached and the entire team stayed at Armenia. Its first official match was played against Universidad Nacional at the Estadio Alfonso López Pumarejo in Bogotá, which they won by a 1–0 score with a goal by Alfredo L'Spina, whilst its first home match was played on 19 March 1951 against Deportes Caldas at Estadio San José, winning 3–1 with a brace by Roberto Urruti and a goal by Mario Garelli.

In 1953, the club changed its name to Atlético Quindío per decision made by the then Mayor of Armenia, and finished as runner-up in that year's league tournament, behind Millonarios. It followed up with another runner-up finish in 1954, a third place in the following season, and their first title in 1956 when they finished three points ahead of Millonarios. The team featured players such as Julio César Asciolo, Manuel Dante Pais, José Francisco Lombardo, Nelson "El Viejito" Vargas, Ricardo "El Pibe" Díaz, Álvaro Lahidalga; Alejandro Carrillo, Jaime "El Manco" Gutiérrez, Francisco Solano Patiño, Alejandrino Génes and Roberto "Benitín" Urruti, and also had the tournament's top scorer in Jaime Gutiérrez, who scored 21 goals. In 1956 they also won the Copa Cicrodeportes, in which they played against Millonarios, Independiente Santa Fe, and Ecuadorian side Barcelona de Guayaquil. Deportes Quindío became the first Colombian champion hailing from a city other than a department capital, as well as the only Colombian champion unable to take part in the Copa Libertadores, which started to be played since 1960.

After decades of irregular campaigns and ups and downs, ranging from a last place finish in 1966 to appearances in the final hexagonal in the 70s, Deportes Quindío made an outstanding campaign in the final stretch of the 1996–97 season, with players such as strikers Daniel Tílger and Rubén Darío Hernández, midfielders Marquinho and Juan Guillermo Villa, defenders Robinson Rojas, Alexánder Posada, and Frank Rengifo, keeper Darío Aguirre, team captain Jorge Iván Victoria and Óscar Héctor Quintabani as manager. The team made it to the finals of the Torneo Adecuación but were beaten there by Atlético Bucaramanga and prevented from playing the finals against América de Cali with a late goal by Orlando Ballesteros in the second leg. Nevertheless, the defeat in the Adecuación finals qualified Deportes Quindío to the 1998 Copa CONMEBOL, where they were eliminated by Brazilian side Sampaio Corrêa in the quarter-finals. In 1998, Quindío made it to the semi-finals in the league, finishing in seventh place in the overall table and qualifying to the next year's Copa CONMEBOL, in which they lost to Venezuelan side Estudiantes de Mérida on penalties in the first round.

In 2000, one year after the 1999 Armenia earthquake that devastated the region, Deportes Quindío ended the season in last place of the overall table and were relegated to Categoría Primera B for the first time, but were immediately promoted back to the top tier by winning the 2001 Primera B tournament with Eduardo Lara as manager. Promotion was sealed on 21 October 2001 with one matchday to go, with Quindío beating Deportivo Rionegro 3–1 at home, while Chicó failed to defeat Unión Magdalena. In their return to Primera A, Quindío were able to avoid relegation consistently while also inflicting upsets such as a 6–1 thrashing of Millonarios in 2007. In the 2008 Apertura tournament, and under the managerial direction of Néstor Otero, Deportes Quindío advanced to the semi-final stage for the first time since the league started awarding two championships per season, placing eighth with 25 points at the end of the first stage, and in the 2010 Finalización they also managed to reach the semi-finals, being managed by Fernando "Pecoso" Castro.

Deportes Quindío were relegated to Primera B for the second time at the end of the 2013 Categoría Primera A season despite winning their last game against Boyacá Chicó, after they ended in bottom place of the relegation table with 114 points, one point behind Cúcuta Deportivo, who defeated Atlético Nacional and qualified for the relegation play-off. They had a chance to make an immediate return to the top flight like in 2001, by winning the 2014 Finalización and playing the season's grand final against Jaguares de Córdoba, which they lost by a 3–2 score on aggregate. This defeat qualified Quindío for the promotion play-off, where they had one last chance to earn promotion but they eventually lost to Uniautónoma. The following year, Deportes Quindío took part in a special tournament made to expand the Primera A tournament to 20 teams, in which they narrowly missed out on promotion after drawing with Cúcuta Deportivo with a controversial goal scored by Marco Lazaga, while in 2016, they were once again left at the doors of promotion, losing a crucial match to América de Cali on the final semi-finals matchday when they just needed a draw to clinch promotion.

Deportes Quindío stayed in Primera B until the 2021 season, when they won the Apertura tournament by beating Cortuluá in the double-legged final and advanced to play the grand final against Atlético Huila, winners of the 2020 tournament. Although they ended up losing the grand final to Huila by a 3–1 aggregate score, they were promoted after ending up on top of the aggregate table of the 2020 and 2021–I tournaments. However, their stay in Primera A was short-lived, being relegated back to the second tier after just five months with a 3–0 defeat at home against Patriotas, who were the team's main rivals in the relegation table of the 2021 Primera A tournament.

Stadium

Honours

National honours
Categoría Primera A (1): 1956
Runners-up (2): 1953, 1954

Categoría Primera B (1): 2001
Runners-up (2): 2014, 2021

Performance in CONMEBOL competitions
Copa CONMEBOL: 2 appearances
1998: Quarter-finals
1999: First Round

Current squad

Managers

  Óscar Héctor Quintabani (1996 – 1997, 2020 – )
 Arturo Boyacá
 Óscar Ramos
 Carlos Restrepo
 Jaime Rodríguez
 Efraín Sánchez (1965 – 1966)
 Vito Andrés Bártoli (1977 – 1978)
 Luis Augusto García (1985 – 1986)
 Fernando Castro (1987, 1989)
 Álvaro de Jesús Gómez (1990)
 Luis Augusto García (1991)
 Wilman Conde (2000)
 Eduardo Lara (2001 – 2002)
 Diego Umaña (Jan 1, 2006 – June 30, 2007)
 Néstor Otero (Dec 1, 2007 – Oct 22, 2009)
 Wilman Conde (July 1, 2009 – March 23, 2010)
 Fernando Castro (March 29, 2010 – Nov 20, 2012)
 Eduardo Cruz (Nov 24, 2012 – May 6, 2013)
 Miguel Augusto Prince (2013 – 2015)
 José Eugenio Hernández (2016)

References

Affiliated teams
  Boca Juniors de Cali

External links

Deportes Quindío's Official Website

 
Football clubs in Colombia
Association football clubs established in 1951
1951 establishments in Colombia
Armenia, Colombia
Categoría Primera A clubs
Categoría Primera B clubs